Dionne Quan  is an American voice actress, known for her roles as Kimi Watanabe in Rugrats and Trixie Tang in The Fairly OddParents.

Early life
Quan was born in Lexington, Massachusetts to Lori and Daryl Quan, who ran a sewing machine and vacuum store in Vallejo, California. She is legally blind, having been born with optic nerve hypoplasia. Quan grew up in San Francisco, California.

When she was 10, her father heard a radio interview with a teacher who instructed students in voice-over acting, and he immediately enrolled Dionne for lessons. She obtained her first voice work at the age of 14 for television commercials and acted in high school productions. Quan graduated from Benicia High School in 1998.

Career
Quan was cast as Kimi Watanabe in Rugrats in Paris: The Movie (2000), her film debut. She continued playing the role on the series itself, Rugrats, film Rugrats Go Wild (2003) and the spinoff All Grown Up!. Quan provided the voices of Trixie Tang in The Fairly OddParents as well as Yasmin in the Bratz franchise.

Due to her disability, Quan is given scripts written in Braille as opposed to standard lettering.

Filmography

Film and television

Video games

References

External links

American voice actresses
Living people
American blind people
People from Lexington, Massachusetts
American people of Chinese descent
Actresses from Massachusetts
21st-century American actresses
Year of birth missing (living people)
Blind actors